Marina Goglidze-Mdivani (Georgian: მარინა გოგლიძე-მდივანი; born October 6, 1936 in Tbilisi, Georgian SSR, USSR) is a Soviet and Canadian virtuoso pianist of Georgian descent.

Biography 

Marina Goglidze-Mdivani was born on October 6, 1936 in Tbilisi, Georgian SSR. Her father was the chess player Victor Goglidze. In 1954 she graduated from the Tbilisi State Conservatory with honors, receiving the gold medal. There, she was taught by Evgenia Tcherniavskaya. From 1955 to 1960, she studied at the Moscow Conservatory under Jacob Milstein, and subsequently completed post-graduate studies under the tutelage of Emil Gilels.  Upon graduation, she commenced an eight-week tour of the United States, culminating on November 27, 1963 at Carnegie Hall in New York City.  At that time Mdivani’s impresario was the renowned Sol Hurok. For the next twenty-five years, she was a principal soloist of the Moscow Philharmonic Society.  Mdivani's career as orchestral soloist and recitalist took her throughout Europe, Russia and North and South America.

In 1961, she participated in and won Le Premier Prix at the Concours International Marguerite Long-Jacques Тhibaud in Paris.  In 1962, she competed in the Second International Tchaikovsky Competition, where she was awarded the 4th prize. The competition that year is known as one of the stiffest piano competitions in history.

Mdivani has taught at institutions in Eastern Europe and the Middle East and has also served on the juries of international competitions.

In 1992 Mdivani joined the faculty of the Schulich School of Music of McGill University in Montreal. Throughout her career, Mdivani mastered a very large repertoire including approximately 40 concertos, a vast number of chamber works, and countless solo piano works. Often, her programs were unusual; for example, on January 24, 1986 in the Great Hall of the Moscow Conservatory, Mdivani performed all five piano concertos of Sergei Prokofiev in one concert.  She has had a long and esteemed music career, performing in more than 3,000 recitals. In 1976, she was awarded the honorable title of a People's Artist of the Republic of Georgia.

Mdivani has lived in Montreal since 1992 with her family Ekaterina and Anna Mdivani.

Premieres

Repertoire 

Concertos:
ArenskyF minor;
BachD minor;
BeethovenNo. 1, 2, and 3;
BrahmsNo. 1, 2;
HaydnD Major, G Major;
LisztNo. 1, 2;
MendelssohnG minor;
ProkofievNo. 1, 2, 3, 4, 5;
RachmaninoffNo. 1, 2, 3, 4, Rhapsody on a Theme of Paganini;
SchumannA minor;
ShostakovichNo. 1;
TaktakishviliNo. 1, 2, 4;
TchaikovskyNo. 1;
StravinskyConcerto for Piano and Wind Instruments;

Solo repertoire:
Works by Bach, Beethoven, Brahms, Busoni, Chopin, Debussy, Gubaidulina, Haydn, Hindemith, Kefadis, Liszt, Mendelssohn, Mussorgsky, Mozart, Ovchinnikov, Prokofiev, Rachmaninoff, Reger, Schnittke, Schubert, Schumann, Scriabin, Stravinsky, Taktakishvili, Tchaikovsky and many other composers.

Partial Discography 

 Tchaikovsky Concerto N1 en si bemol mineur. Concerts Colonne Pierre Dervaux. 1962, Pathe Marconi
 Mussorgsky Les Tableaux D'Une Exposition, Mendelssohn Variations Serieuses. 1963, Pathe Marconi
 Weinberg, Schubert, Haydn.  1964, Melodiya
 Prokofiev Concerto N3, Conductor G.Rozhdestvensky, 1963, Melodiya
 Taktakishvili Concerto N1, Conductor Taktakishvili, 1968, Melodiya
 Ovchinnikov Chorus, Prelude & Fugue, 1962, Melodiya

References

Bibliography 

 Howard KleinMarina Mdivani in Piano Recital; New York Times (1957Current; November 28, 1963; Pro Quest Historical Newspapers The New York Times) Soviet Performer is Heard in Local Debut at Carnegie ...
 Magazine  "Disques" N127 February 1962
 Eric McLeanA powerful recital by Marina Mdivani (the Montreal Star, February 18, 1967)
 Katherina SayerSoviet pianist graces MAC (the "Hamilton Spectator" 1993).
 W.ReicheRough applause to the Soviet pianist. Sachsische Zeitung. 1968

External links 

 https://www.youtube.com/watch?v=naXQqR8_iEgBeethovenConcerto N2 final part, ConductorYuri Simonov
 https://web.archive.org/web/20110721030205/http://www.marinamdivani.gol.ge/

1936 births
Classical pianists from Georgia (country)
Women classical pianists
Women pianists from Georgia (country)
Living people
Long-Thibaud-Crespin Competition prize-winners
Academic staff of McGill University
Moscow Conservatory alumni
Soviet classical pianists
20th-century classical pianists
Tbilisi State Conservatoire alumni
21st-century classical pianists
20th-century women pianists
21st-century women pianists